Philippe Haïm (born 2 September 1967, in Paris) is a French film director, writer and composer. He sometimes is also actor, as in Comme un poisson hors de l'eau (1999).

Filmography 
 1986 : Maine Océan
 1991 : Les Naufragés
 1992 : Voyage à Rome
 1994 : Carences
 1994 : Descente
 1995 : Double Express
 1995 : L'Appât
 1995 : Entre ces mains-là
 1995 : Mademoiselle Pompom
 1997 : Barracuda
 1997 : Zardock ou les malheurs d'un suppôt
 1997 : Haine comme normal
 1997 : Il faut que ça brille
 1999 : 
 2000 : Bluff
 2004 : Les Dalton
 2008 : Secret Defense

External links 

 

1967 births
French film directors
Living people
Male actors from Paris
French male screenwriters
French screenwriters
French male film actors